In mathematics, the Denjoy–Luzin theorem, introduced independently by  and   
states that if a trigonometric series converges absolutely on a set of positive measure, then the sum of its coefficients converges absolutely, and in particular the trigonometric series converges absolutely everywhere.

References

Fourier series
Theorems in analysis